Prosser Hollow Brook is a river in Delaware County, New York. It flows into Charlotte Creek west-southwest of Davenport Center.

References

Rivers of New York (state)
Rivers of Delaware County, New York